Croatia competed at the 2004 Summer Paralympics in Athens. The country's delegation consisted of 17 competitors.

Medalists

Sports

Athletics

Men
Track events

Field events

Women
Track events

Field events

Equestrian

Mixed

Shooting

Men, mixed

Swimming

Men

Women

Table tennis

Men's singles

Men's team class 9 (Gubica, Kovačić, Rakić)

See also
2004 Summer Paralympics
Croatia at the Paralympics
Croatia at the 2004 Summer Olympics

References

External links
International Paralympic Committee

Nations at the 2004 Summer Paralympics
2004
Paralympics